Sofie Gråbøl (born 30 July 1968) is a Danish actress. She has starred in a number of films, with her breakthrough role in the 1986 Danish film Early Spring, directed by Astrid Henning-Jensen, playing the lead role in the film version of Tove Ditlevsen's novel Barndommens gade when she was 17 years old. On television she has starred in Taxa and Nikolaj og Julie.

Gråbøl has become known in Denmark for playing emotional roles, but she achieved international fame as a detectivethe cool and distant lead character Inspector Sarah Lund in all three series of The Killing. In the UK it was broadcast on BBC4 with great success, winning a BAFTA award, and bringing Gråbøl celebrity status.

Personal life 
Gråbøl resides in Copenhagen where she has lived all her life. Both her parents, father Kaj Fladhede Gråbøl and mother Mette Koustrup, were architects. She has an older brother Niels Gråbøl who is a director, and the ex-husband of actress Ditte Gråbøl. Gråbøl's father left her mother when her mother was pregnant with Gråbøl. She was brought up by her mother. Her mother remarried to a Maoist architect and for a time they lived in a commune.

Gråbøl divorced her husband, the film director Jacob Thuesen, in 2006. They have two children; a son, Bror, and a daughter, Gudrun.

In 2012 she was diagnosed with cancer and had surgery and chemotherapy and is now in remission.

Early career
In the early years of her career she studied theology and worked in a bookstore. Responding to a newspaper advertisement at the age of 17, she was given the role of an artist's nude model in Oviri, a 1986 film about Paul Gauguin with Donald Sutherland. Despite having had no formal training, and only entering acting on the encouragement of her mother, she has worked continuously since then.

She said, "I thought it would be like a summer holiday job ...then one film led to another and suddenly I was an actor and I never really felt that I had made the decision ... I felt at home in the language of acting.""  Her breakthrough role was in the 1986 Danish film directed by Astrid Henning-Jensen, Early Spring.

Gråbøl is famous in Denmark with a wide body of work from comedy to Shakespeare.

The Killing 

In 2007, Gråbøl portrayed the role of police Detective Sarah Lund obsessed with solving the sadistic killing of a schoolgirl in the Danish television series The Killing (literally "The Crime"). Producers of the show envisioned breaking the clichés of female characters usually portrayed on television and film. Lund was to be a driven and relentless detective without her primary concern being for her physical appearance or sexuality. 

Gråbøl was involved early on in the development process of the series and had numerous discussions with writer and series creator Søren Sveistrup. Her input was integral to the creation of the character, from keeping the character's past a mystery to the choice of clothing, and especially that the character was to be emotionally isolated. At one point, the writers were considering having Lund have an affair with one of the suspects. She fought this plot line, explaining that Lund was a female Clint Eastwood, and it was removed. It was originally intended that Sarah Lund should die but this was changed halfway through the series. Gråbøl had become known in Denmark for playing emotional characters and the role of the cool and distant Lund was a stark departure.

The series was a huge success in Denmark with over half the population watching. Although already well known in Denmark, Gråbøl now found herself stopped on the street as fans of the show wanted to know the secret of the killer. The series was then played throughout Europe. With the show's success, it played in back-to-back weekend installments in the UK on BBC4. With no promotion, the show became a word-of-mouth success and even topped Mad Men in the ratings. 

Gråbøl had been a famous actress in Denmark for twenty five years when she suddenly, to her surprise, achieved cult status in Britain. Even the shape-concealing jumper (sweater) she wore in the show became iconic. She received requests for interviews and offers to work in Britain, most of which she had to decline due to her busy work schedule. However, she had a cameo in the BBC comedy Absolutely Fabulous playing her character Detective Lund. In the UK, Gråbøl was named Best Actress at the Crime Thriller Awards and the show won the 2011 BAFTA for Best International TV Show. The BAFTA was awarded to Gråbøl, creator and writer Søren Sveistrup, producer Piv Bernth and director Birger Larsen.

In Britain the series had subtitles but for the American audience it was remade. Commenting on the first series of The Killing remake, while saying she thought the American version was good, Gråbøl said it was unfortunate that American audiences would not accept shows with subtitles because with the success of the show in Britain, "there's a strong sense of a cultural exchange going on. By watching each other's stories you exchange something very valuable. It's about language and culture and the ways of looking at life." In series two of the American version Gråbøl has a small part as a Seattle district attorney. In July 2012, the US remake was cancelled by the network.

Forbrydelsen II was released on 2009, and Forbrydelsen III was released in 2012.

After The Killing 
Gråbøl was diagnosed with breast cancer in December 2012 for which she underwent surgery and chemotherapy. She temporarily retired from acting in 2013, but returned to work the next year, appearing as Hildur Odegard, a Norwegian mayor, in two series of  the British TV series Fortitude. In August 2014 she made her English language début on stage in Edinburgh, appearing as Margaret of Denmark in James III: The True Mirror, the third of Rona Munro's historical trilogy The James Plays.

In 2015 she played a role, together with Swedish actress Frida Farrell, in the music video "Under the Make-up" for the song with the same title by the Norwegian band a-Ha. It was released on 24 August 2015.

In 2018 she was awarded the Nordic Language Prize in Oslo, Norway for her contribution to positive attitudes between neighbouring Nordic languages.

Filmography

Film

Television

Awards and nominations

References

External links 

1968 births
Danish film actresses
Living people
Actresses from Copenhagen
People from Frederiksberg
Danish television actresses
Recipients of the Crown Prince Couple's Culture Prize
Best Actress Bodil Award winners
Best Actress Robert Award winners
Best Actress BAFTA Award (television) winners